NFL Street is a series of sports video games developed by EA Tiburon and published by Electronic Arts. It combines the talent and big names of the NFL with the atmosphere of street football.

History
NFL Street is the first installment of the NFL Street series, developed by EA Tiburon, and published by Electronic Arts. The game was released on January 13, 2004, for the PlayStation 2, GameCube, and Xbox. Similar to the Blitz series, Street is seven-on-seven American football, modeled after its informal variant, street football. In the game, the player could create a team and complete challenges for rewards, play a pickup game with teams made from a pool of select NFL players, or just play a regular exhibition game.

NFL Street 2 is the first sequel to NFL Street, released on December 22, 2004, for the PlayStation 2, GameCube, Xbox, and later PlayStation Portable (under the name NFL Street 2: Unleashed). The game introduced new game modes such as Own The City, NFL Gauntlet, 4 on 4, and Crush the Carrier. It also introduced new wall moves (such as the wall juke), Gamebreaker 2's, and several new playing fields.

The third installment of the series, NFL Street 3, was released November 14, 2006, for the PlayStation 2 and PlayStation Portable. New game modes include Play Elimination, Yards for Points, and Bank, and the player can now perform specific Game Breaker Moves while on offense or defense (such as a Game Breaker Juke or a Lock on Tackle).

Games

Reception
The series has received generally favorable reviews from reviewing websites.

See also
 FIFA Street
 NBA Street

References

External links
NFL Street series at MobyGames

Video game franchises
EA Sports games
Electronic Arts franchises
Video game franchises introduced in 2004